Marin Čilić was the two-time defending champion, but lost in the first round to Kei Nishikori.
3rd seed Stanislas Wawrinka defeated 7th seed Xavier Malisse 7–5, 4–6, 6–1 in the final match.

Seeds

Qualifying

Draw

Finals

Top half

Bottom half

External links
 Main draw
 Qualifying draw

2011 Aircel Chennai Open
Aircel Chennai Open - Singles
Maharashtra Open